is a 2016 role-playing video game developed by Atlus. Persona 5 is the sixth installment in the Persona series, which is part of the larger Megami Tensei franchise. It was released for the PlayStation 3 and PlayStation 4 in Japan in September 2016 and worldwide in April 2017, and was published by Atlus in Japan and North America and by Deep Silver in PAL territories. An enhanced version featuring new content,  was released for the PlayStation 4 in Japan in October 2019 and worldwide in March 2020, published by Atlus in Japan and worldwide by parent company Sega. Royal was later released for the Nintendo Switch, PlayStation 5, Windows, Xbox One, and Xbox Series X/S in October 2022.

It takes place in modern-day Tokyo and follows a high school student known by the pseudonym Joker who transfers to a new school after being falsely accused of assault and put on probation. Over the course of a school year, he and other students awaken to a special power, becoming a group of secret vigilantes known as the Phantom Thieves of Hearts. They explore the Metaverse, a supernatural realm born from humanity's subconscious desires, to steal malevolent intent from the hearts of adults. As with previous games in the series, the party battles enemies known as Shadows using physical manifestations of their psyche known as their Personas. The game incorporates role-playing and dungeon crawling elements alongside social simulation scenarios.

Persona 5 was developed by P-Studio, an internal development studio within Atlus led by game director and producer Katsura Hashino. Along with Hashino, returning staff from earlier Persona games included character designer Shigenori Soejima and music composer Shoji Meguro. Preparatory work began during the development of Persona 4, with full development beginning after the release of Catherine in 2011. First announced in 2013, Persona 5 was delayed from its original late 2014 release date due to the game not being fully finished. Its themes revolve around attaining freedom from the limitations of modern society, while the story was strongly inspired by picaresque fiction; the party's Personas were based on outlaws and rebels from literature.

Persona 5 won several awards and has been cited as one of the greatest role-playing video games of all time, with praise given to its visual presentation, gameplay, story, and music. Including Royal, it has sold over  copies worldwide, making it the best-selling entry in the Megami Tensei franchise. Several other related media have also been released, including three spin-off games, Persona 5: Dancing in Starlight, Persona 5 Strikers, and Persona 5: The Phantom X as well as manga and anime adaptations. The game's cast has also made appearances in other games, such as Joker appearing as a playable character in the 2018 crossover fighting game Super Smash Bros. Ultimate.

Gameplay 

Persona 5 is a role-playing video game where the player takes on the role of a male high school student, codenamed Joker, who lives out a single year while attending school in modern-day Tokyo. The game is governed by a day-night cycle and weather systems that determine general behavior similar to a social simulation game. The year is punctuated by scripted and random events as Joker attends school. He can perform part-time jobs and pursue leisure activities or create battle items. These various activities raise character attributes, which grant passive buffing effects during battle. When in the real world, the main protagonist can develop character relationships known as Confidants; an evolution of the Social Link system from Persona 3 and Persona 4. With this system, the main protagonist can converse with and improve his relationship with other characters he meets, with some leading to possible romances. Improving Confidant ranks with party members unlocks various abilities for use in combat, such as the "Baton Pass" ability, which allows the player to directly select another character after a critical hit while granting a temporary attack boost. Improving ranks with non-party Confidants grant other bonuses, such as giving access to new items and equipment and boosting experience point and yen gain.

Alongside the normal school life is dungeon crawling gameplay of two different types within a realm called the Metaverse: story-specific dungeons called Palaces and a multi-layered, randomly-generated Dungeon called Mementos. Both are populated by Shadows, physical manifestations of suppressed psyches that are modeled after mythological and religious figures. Within the dungeons of Mementos, the party can fulfill requests from non-playable characters (NPCs) received from Confidant links. While navigating, the party can use stealth to avoid enemy Shadows, and some areas hold puzzles that can be solved using an insight ability known as "Third Eye", which highlights interactable objects and enemy strength compared to the party. When exploring story-centered Palaces, a "Security Level" is present, where the party being spotted or fleeing combat results in security being raised. If security reaches 100%, the party is forced to leave the Palace. The security level can be lowered by launching surprise attacks on and eliminating enemies, and also lowers automatically overnight. Throughout Palaces are locations known as "Safe Rooms". In them, the player can save their game, heal their party, and fast travel to other safe rooms within the Palace.

As with previous entries in the series, the game uses a turn-based combat system. Battles can be initiated when the party runs into an enemy, or they can launch a surprise attack known as an "Ambush" and gain an advantage in battle. In battle, the party has access to melee and ranged weapons, in addition to being able to summon Personas. Personas are manifestations of the main characters' inner psyche and used mainly for special attacks. If a character strikes an enemy's weakness, they knock the enemy down and are awarded an additional turn known as a "1 More". If all enemies are knocked down, a "Hold Up" is triggered. During one, the party can launch a devastating "All-Out Attack", demand money or items, or enter a negotiation. Negotiation allows Joker to win the selected Shadow over to their side to become a new Persona, though they can only be persuaded to join if Joker is their level or higher. Similar to previous entries, party members can be knocked out, and if the main character is knocked out, the game ends. At times, if a party member is knocked out, they can be captured by enemy Shadows, and is unable to return to the party if the resultant negotiation fails.

New Personas can be gained from battle through successful negotiation, and different Persona types are represented through different arcana linked to Confidant links. Personas can be combined, or "fused", or otherwise further manipulated within the Velvet Room, a realm Joker visits as part of his journey through the story. In the Velvet Room, Personas can be fused with "Guillotine" fusion processes, with the resultant Persona inheriting skills and stats from its parents. The more skills a Persona has, the more are passed on to the fused Persona. How powerful Personas are through fusion depends on how advanced its associated Confidant link is. Also, Personas can be sacrificed in various ways, also styled after styles of capital punishment. "Hanging" grants a sacrificed Persona's experience points to another chosen Persona, and "Electric Chair" sacrifices one to create a high-end item. A Persona can also be sent into "Solitary Confinement", where they undergo intensive training and gain additional skills quicker than normal. The number of days a Persona must remain to gain strength lessens based on its arcana strength.

Minor multiplayer elements are incorporated through the "Thieves Guild" feature. Similar to the "Vox Populi" system from Persona 4 Golden, players have the option of seeing what activities other players did during any given day. Players can send messages to each other, in addition to affecting the Alertness meter in the player's favor, and aiding in battle when a party member is taken hostage by an enemy.

Synopsis

Setting and characters

Persona 5 takes place within the Persona universe, revolving around a group of high school students who harness Personas, physical manifestations of their inner psyche. The story begins in April 2016 and spans roughly a year. Persona 5 is set in modern-day Tokyo with navigable real-world locations within the city, including Akihabara, Shinjuku, and Shibuya. Alongside larger environments, there are specific locations that the protagonist can enter, such as shops, restaurants and movie theaters. A major setting throughout the game is Shujin Academy, a high school the protagonist attends. The second major location is the "Metaverse", a supernatural realm consisting of the physical manifestation of humanity's subconscious desires. In the Metaverse, people with corrupted enough desires form their own unique "Palace," which is modeled after their distorted perception of a place in the real world, along with a Shadow version of themselves (their true self) possessing a "Treasure" symbolic of their desires. Returning from earlier entries is the Velvet Room, a place that exists for the growth of Persona users that shifts appearance depending on the current guest; in Persona 5, it takes the form of a prison.

The player character is a silent protagonist, a commonplace feature in the Persona series, codenamed Joker. He becomes the leader of a vigilante group known as the Phantom Thieves of Hearts, who change the hearts of criminals and other malevolent people through the Metaverse. He forms it together with school delinquent Ryuji Sakamoto, fashion model Ann Takamaki and Morgana, a mysterious cat-like creature. More people join the group throughout the game, including art prodigy Yusuke Kitagawa, student council president Makoto Niijima, hikikomori computer hacker Futaba Sakura, and cultured corporate heiress Haru Okumura. Also interacting with Joker are high school detective Goro Akechi, public prosecutor and Makoto's older sister, Sae Niijima, and the residents of the Velvet Room, Igor, and his two assistants Caroline and Justine.

Plot
Much of the story is told through flashbacks while Sae Niijima interrogates the protagonist. After the protagonist defends a woman from assault, he is framed for assaulting the man responsible and put on probation, resulting in expulsion from his school. He is sent to Tokyo to stay with family friend Sojiro Sakura and attend Shujin Academy during his year-long probation. After his arrival, he is drawn into the Velvet Room, where Igor warns him that he must be rehabilitated to avoid future ruin and grants him access to a supernatural mobile app that leads him into the Metaverse and the Palace of the school's abusive volleyball coach Suguru Kamoshida. The protagonist meets Morgana, who informs him of the ability to change wicked people's hearts by stealing their "Treasure," the emotional root of their behavior and desires, from the Palaces ruled by their Shadow selves. The protagonist assumes the codename Joker and, together with Morgana and fellow students Ryuji Sakamoto and Ann Takamaki whom he befriends, reforms Kamoshida.

The group forms the Phantom Thieves of Hearts, stealing corruption from the hearts of adults to reform the city, slowly learning of a broader conspiracy to influence the hearts of Tokyo. They are joined along the way by Yusuke Kitagawa, whom they help to reform his corrupt teacher Ichiryusai Madarame; Sae's sister Makoto Nijima, the school's student council president who is initially assigned to spy on them but joins after being blackmailed by criminal boss Junya Kaneshiro; Sojiro's adopted daughter Futaba Sakura, who sunk into a depressed state after the conspiracy murdered her mother and redirected the blame to her using a forged suicide note; and Haru Okumura, who rebels against her billionaire father, Kunikazu Okumura's, attempts to control her life and his mistreatment of his employees. As the number of the Phantom Thieves' members and successes grows, they attract the public's attention and the police, including Sae and Goro Akechi. The Phantom Thieves' popularity plummets after they are framed for causing Haru's father to go into a fatal mental shutdown by a black-masked assassin, who was mentioned by other targets. Pursuing the conspiracy, the group is joined by Akechi, who convinces them to change Sae's heart.

After infiltrating Sae's Palace, Joker is captured by the police, and Sae is allowed to interrogate him even though she was removed from the case. Despite being semi-delirious from a truth serum overdose, Joker recalls most of the events up to this point and is ultimately able to convince Sae of the truth. Akechi is revealed to be the assassin and attempts to kill Joker, but the Phantom Thieves, who had discovered his betrayal prior to the heist, use the Metaverse to fake Joker's death. Aided by Sae and Sojiro, the Phantom Thieves go undercover and deduce the conspiracy's leader to be politician Masayoshi Shido, who has been using Akechi's ability to infiltrate the Metaverse to remove obstacles from his path toward becoming Prime Minister and imposing his reforms on Japan, as well as being the one who framed and pressed charges against Joker. When the Phantom Thieves infiltrate Shido's Palace, they face Akechi, who reveals himself as Shido's illegitimate son and plans to get revenge on Shido for abandoning him and his late mother. Once defeated, Akechi sacrifices himself to protect the Phantom Thieves from a group of enemies, allowing them to ultimately defeat Shido. Despite Shido's arrest and confession, the public's opinion of him remains primarily unchanged, and Shido may be released through the manipulation of his allies. The Phantom Thieves make a final heist to infiltrate the depths of Mementos, the Palace of everyone's hearts, to steal the Treasure at its core. Inside, they discover that the public is in chaos and has chosen to give up their autonomy.

The Phantom Thieves are ejected from Mementos by the Treasure itself, manifested as the Holy Grail, and vanish after witnessing the Metaverse merge with reality. Waking in the Velvet Room, Joker confronts Igor, Caroline, and Justine. Caroline and Justine regain their memories and integrate into Lavenza, their proper form. Lavenza reveals the Igor that Joker has been seeing in the Velvet Room until this point is actually Yaldabaoth, the God of Control, who imprisoned the actual Igor. Yaldabaoth, Mementos' Treasure made sentient, was created from humanity's wish to give up control and be free from suffering. Through a wager made with Igor over humanity's goals, Yaldabaoth had given Joker and Akechi their abilities to see the influence of their actions on society while steering the wager in his favor. 

Yaldabaoth then makes an offer to Joker to return the world to its previous state at the cost of his freedom. If Joker accepts the offer, the game goes into an alternate ending where Joker remains as a Phantom Thief and keeps on changing people's hearts. If Joker rejects the offer, he reunites with the rest of the Phantom Thieves and fights Yaldabaoth. In the fight, Joker's confidants rally the support of the people, rebelling against Yaldabaoth's control and allowing Joker to awaken his ultimate persona, Satanael, to destroy Yaldabaoth and the Metaverse. After Yaldabaoth's defeat, Joker turns himself in to the police for Shido to be prosecuted. While Joker is incarcerated, the rest of the Phantom Thieves and his confidants successfully help secure evidence of Joker's innocence in the assault charge, leading to his conviction being overturned. By spring, Joker's friends drive him back to his hometown.

Royal
In Persona 5 Royal, two new characters interact with the Phantom Thieves: Kasumi Yoshizawa, an accomplished rhythmic gymnast who transferred to Shujin at the same time as Joker, and Takuto Maruki, a school counselor hired after Kamoshida is exposed. Kasumi awakens to her Persona after discovering a new Palace in Odaiba with Joker. Maruki, in turn, talks to each of the Phantom Thieves, learning their deepest wishes. After defeating Yaldabaoth, a still-living Akechi turns himself over to Sae in Joker's place. At the beginning of the following year, Joker finds reality distorted; Akechi was released without reason, and each Phantom Thief has had their deepest wish granted. Joker, Akechi, and Kasumi investigate the Palace in Odaiba and learn that its owner is Maruki, a Persona-user able to alter reality. Using Yaldabaoth's leftover power, Maruki gained control over Mementos, determined to create a world where everyone's dreams become a reality. Maruki reveals that "Kasumi" is actually her twin sister Sumire; the latter has been impersonating her to cope with the former's death, revealed to be due to the influence of Maruki's powers. Maruki gives Joker time to choose whether to accept his idealized reality. Joker reminds the Phantom Thieves and Sumire of their real lives, and they agree to change Maruki's heart.

Joker learns from Maruki that Akechi is only alive in the altered reality due to Joker's desire to save him and that whether he continues to live depends on Joker accepting Maruki's world. Joker refuses his offer, and the Phantom Thieves defeat Maruki the following day. Reality returns to normal, and with Akechi missing, Joker finds himself back in prison, but as with the original game's story, he is cleared and released. At their final meeting, having reflected on their rejection of Maruki's reality, each member of the Phantom Thieves chooses to pursue their own future. On the day he is due to return home, Joker escapes tailing government agents with help from both the Phantom Thieves and a reformed Maruki, who is now a taxi driver. At the station, Sumire finds him and bids him farewell. A post-credits scene achieved through specific gameplay requirements shows a person resembling Akechi passing by the window on Joker's train ride home.

Development
The game was developed by P-Studio, an internal development studio within Atlus dedicated to handling the Persona series. Preparatory development began in 2008 following the release of Persona 4, with full development beginning following the release of Catherine in 2011. Development lasted five years. Series director Katsura Hashino was only fully involved in development after Catherine was finished, later calling the latter game a test for the next Persona game's development. Persona 5 would be Hashino's last game in the series as the leader of P-Studio, as he would afterwards form a separate internal team called Studio Zero. When production started, the staff consisted of around 40 people. During full production, this number expanded to 70 with 15 planners, 15 programmers, and between 30 and 45 designers. These included lead designer Naoya Maeda, who had previously done modeling work for the Trauma Center series. The general development was a challenge for the team, as they intentionally changed their development structure due to the more powerful hardware they were working with.

While the final game retains the turn-based battle system from earlier entries, one of the early design drafts was for an action-based system incorporating real-time elements foreign to the series. This idea was ultimately scrapped, but real-time command elements were introduced into the battle system, allowing the gameplay to evolve without extensive changes to the core system. One major new addition was unique dungeons with locked layouts as opposed to the predominantly randomly generated dungeons of previous Persona games. This was done to better emulate the game's themes and provide veteran players with something different. A returning feature from both earlier Persona games and the mainline Megami Tensei series was Negotiation. As it was considered a key part of the overall franchise by fans, Hashino decided to reintroduce it after being absent from the previous two mainline entries. The Negotiation system for Persona 5 was tied into the origins of Shadows as suppressed psyches within the Collective Unconscious. The "Hold Up" function was inspired by scenes in films where the antagonist would hold people at gunpoint and make demands. These functions were incorporated due to the game being in part a celebration of the series' history. In-game weather and environmental elements were all designed to reflect the real world. Dungeon layout was split into three distinct types: the Tokyo overworld environments, "institutions" such as Joker's high school, and dungeon environments. Some segments take control away from the player aside from limited dialogue choices; this was chosen as it reflects the controlled environment of Japanese high schoolers.

While Catherine used the third-party Gamebryo game engine, Persona 5 uses a specially-created engine. Hashino believed that the new engine would make rendering their ideas much easier, although it would result in a long wait by fans for the game. The event scene software was also developed internally by Atlus, with an estimated 1,160 scenes being included in the final game. The tools for developing and handling them were greatly expanded over the previous two entries so as to better utilize the more advanced hardware. Character modeling, in general, was handled with a specially-developed cel-shader which helped properly translate the character designs into the game, while also allowing for easy adjustment of shaders and lighting effects during fine-tuning. The characters were originally rendered realistically like in Catherine, but the team felt that it was "wrong" for the Persona series. With this in mind, the team did some trial and error before finding a style that satisfied them, doing something similar for the interface and menu design. In contrast to Persona 4, which has a general deformed look due to the PlayStation 2's hardware limitations on the variety of body shapes, the technology available to the team for Persona 5 enabled unique customization for all relevant character models. Two different models were used for members of the main cast: a detailed model for real-time cutscenes, and a general-use model for general event scenes and gameplay. Persona 5 marked the first time a large number of Personas had been rendered in high definition, something which proved a grueling challenge for the team.

Story and themes
The original story concept was written by Hashino, while the scenario was co-written by Shinji Yamamoto and Yuichiro Tanaka. The initial concept was for a storyline that diverged from the established paths of Persona 3 and 4, with "self-discovery" and "journey" being its keywords. Originally using the concept of a backpacking trip around the world as a framing device for the story, Hashino decided to refocus on Japan in the wake of the 2011 Tōhoku earthquake and tsunami. More specifically, it has been noted that the Japanese government's actions in response to the earthquake and tsunami's fallout, along with Japanese citizens' reactions to how the government acted during that time, may have served as partial influences on the game's themes. Following that crisis and seeing how people were bonding in the face of it, Hashino decided to have the story take place solely in Japan, with the journeying being done through the ever-shifting Palaces. Ultimately, the story's central concepts were inspired by equivalent social changes he saw in modern society, particularly in Japan. Hashino also described the central theme of the game as being about freedom and how the characters attain it. He wanted to make the game more "thematically approachable" for newcomers to the series, and to be an emotional experience that left its audience with a strong sense of catharsis and the inspiration to take on problems in their lives.

The narrative of Persona 5 was designed like an omnibus, with the antagonists pursued by the party changing regularly. The development team has cited three main stories as inspiration, the Chinese novel Water Margin, the Japanese crime movie Hakuchuu no Shikaku, and the Spanish novel Lazarillo de Tormes. Furthermore, the setting and style was compared to picaresque fiction; the team originally asked the question of how a character like Arsène Lupin III might win appeal in modern society. This picaresque theme was carried over into the aesthetics of Persona fusion and sacrifice, which were themed after styles of capital punishment. Having a more "stereotypical" theme enabled the team to create surprising story developments, mixing contemporary drama with the setting of the Persona series. The series' recurring motif of "masks" was used more overtly in the game's plot than previous entries as well, and the game's main locations were based heavily on their real-world counterparts.

The main characters, according to Hashino, share a mindset that they "no longer have a place where they belong in society", though the events of the game give them a sense of belonging. Hashino stated that while the last few games were about the protagonists chasing the antagonists, Persona 5 would instead more prominently feature the antagonists and phenomena caused by them chasing the protagonists during the latter's activities. The characters have been described as "juvenile academics," with their activities as thieves being part of the way they break from societal norms and express themselves. Adhering with this concept, the game's main aim was to show the characters finding the courage to go outside the normal limits of society as set by previous generations. In contrast to previous Persona casts, the party of Persona 5 willingly embrace the unfolding unusual events in their role of masked vigilantes rather than being dragged into them. The cast was originally going to be larger with character Hifumi Togo becoming a Phantom Thief, but as the story was already very large, she was relegated to an optional role as part of the Confidant system. Technological advances such as smartphones and the use of social media were integrated into both the story and gameplay due to their growing prevalence in modern society and how the public responds to real-world scandals.

The characters' initial Personas (Arsène, Captain Kidd, Carmen, Zorro, Goemon, Johanna, Necronomicon, Milady, Robin Hood, and Cendrillon) were themed after outlaws and picaresque heroes to reflect the function and dominant suppressed passions forming the Palace, and also represent aspects of their owners' personalities. Joker's initial Persona was originally the German demon Mephistopheles, but was changed to Arsène as the latter character better fit the game's themes. The cast's ultimate Personas (Satanael, Seiten Taisei, Hecate, Mercurius, Kamu Susano-o, Anat, Prometheus, Astarte, Loki and Vanadis) were based on mythical beings who act as tricksters or rebels. The three main inspirations behind Joker's alter ego were Arsène Lupin, The Fiend with Twenty Faces, and Japanese outlaw hero Ishikawa Goemon. Following a trend from earlier entries, the Velvet Room assistants are named after characters from the novel Frankenstein by Mary Shelley.

The use of adults as antagonists was a more overt expression of narrative elements previously explored in Persona 4. The relation to police activities was also carried over from Persona 4, but this time with the role of protagonists and antagonists reversed. Several writers have highlighted the parallels between the game's various antagonists with real incidents and figures in different sectors of Japanese society (e.g. political, corporate, academic), and how the game's story and characters serve as social commentary on life in Japan. The game's villains and protagonists were also constructed to be parallels of each other, both groups being misfits trying to shape a world they saw as unsatisfactory or corrupted. This was intended to create moral ambiguity about the Phantom Thieves' actions, causing the player to question their concept of justice and their mission as a whole. In addition, the way a vocal minority online could draw attention to and shift public opinion on events and scandals in the news was cited as an inspiration for the ambiguous nature of the Phantom Thieves' actions.

Art design
The art director was Masayoshi Suto, whose most notable work on earlier games included the user interface (UI) displays. Shigenori Soejima, who had worked on the last two main-series Persona games, returned as character designer. The art design reflects the picaresque theme aimed for by the rest of the team. Aesthetically, the team felt that they were picking up where Persona 4 left off. Its styling presentation was an unintentional reflection on the hurdles the team needed to overcome during development. The teaser image used for the game's announcement was designed to convey a sense of the main characters' being chained down by the rules of the modern world. Soejima designed the logo to convey the high-speed existences of the young cast, while elements such as Joker's Persona Arsène were designed to appear old-fashioned by comparison. This presented challenges as Soejima needed to balance this with a strong sense of style.

Soejima was working on prospective designs for the game while Persona 4 was still in development, with his designs evolving as the story for Persona 5 came together. The first character sketches were submitted in 2012. Soejima worked closely with Hashino so the characters and environments reflected the game's themes. Due to being high school students, Soejima found it difficult to make each main character's uniform design distinctive, so he expressed their individuality through their thief costumes. Joker's design was cited by Soejima as his most challenging recent work. Joker needed to both convey a taste of the game's overall art style and to act as an avatar for the player. As the main theme and narrative of Persona 5 revolved around crime and vigilantes triggered by Joker voluntarily choosing that path, Soejima needed to convey this while allowing the character to suit whatever dialogue choices the player decided upon. Due to these difficulties, Joker was given multiple designs in a trial and error process to find the best one. As the "phantom thief" premise was a common stereotype in fiction, Soejima initially drew Joker and the main cast in a style similar to shōnen manga, but these designs were scrapped as they clashed with the Persona series' realistic aesthetics. As with previous entries, the protagonist is a silent character, so Soejima had to work out a way Joker could communicate without dialogue. His solution was to imagine him as the type of person who made plans but did not share them with others. The Persona designs, being based on characters from literature, were intended to evoke both familiarity and surprise from players. Once the names were chosen, Soejima designed the Personas based on that character. The main aim for the game's environments was to create a sense of realism, with its version of Tokyo being modeled after real world locations.

As the team considered previous Persona games to be "fun" but not well marketed, the UI was designed in such a way as to attract a larger, more mainstream audience. When creating the UI, Hashino wanted to demonstrate how a shift in perspective could alter a dull life into an exciting one in the context of the story. Early UI designs were so "aggressively animated" that it obscured what was happening in the game. As a result, the animations were toned down and text orientation was altered, toning down the UI's graphical elements to present a balance between user-friendliness and style. Following the respective thematic coloring of Persona 3 and 4 blue and yellow, Persona 5 uses red, which was chosen to a harsh feeling. Because of this, Suto tested multiple font colors until settling on black and white, as it stood out best against it. Rather than the use of sub-colors like earlier entries, the UI uses only the primary red, black and white colors aside from health and magic point meters, with the menus using a special moving 3D model of Joker which changes position depending on the selected menu.

The game's animated cutscenes were produced by Production I.G and Domerica, and were directed and supervised by Toshiyuki Kono. Kono was contacted three and a half years before the game's completion by Hashino. Faced with the project, Kono felt a great deal of pressure in his role. Persona 5 was the first time Production I.G had worked on the series, though many staff at the studio were fans. Despite this, the studio did not change their standard animation process, focusing on characters as they had done for many of their previous projects. The most important part of the cutscenes was getting the character's expressions right, particularly when it came to the general-mute protagonist. The animated opening sequence was directed by Sayo Yamamoto. The concept behind the characters figure skating around the environment was done as a visual symbolization of the overall theme of breaking free of an oppressive force, and was similar to her work in Yuri on Ice. The scene where Joker first summons his Persona was requested by Atlus to appear "wild", which was difficult as Joker's purpose is as an extension of the player. The blue flame effects related to the Persona were not created with CGI, but hand-drawn by the animators. All the anime cutscenes together were estimated to consist of over an hour of footage.

Music
The score was composed, performed, and produced by series sound director Shoji Meguro. Further contributions, among other general sound design, was handled by Toshiki Konishi, Kenichi Tsuchiya, Atsushi Kitajoh, and Ryota Kozuka; all of them having previously worked on the series as well. Meguro was given full creative freedom to work on the soundtrack and over a roughly three year period produced about 80% of the total tracks. Seven tracks were performed in English by Lyn, a jazz and soul music singer. Her first performance in a video game, Lyn claimed that the most difficult part of her contributions was performing a rap segment in the opening theme, "Wake Up, Get Up, Get Out There". The lyrics were written by Benjamin Franklin, while the ending song, "Hoshi To Bokura To", had lyrics written in Japanese by Shigeo Komori.

To express the game's mood, Meguro incorporated strong acid jazz elements into the score. He also wanted to make the music sound more realistic than previous entries, aiming to match the visuals. Meguro also changed the way the music flowed when compared to the last two Persona games. Instead of the opening and ending themes being conglomerates of the overall score, he described the entire score as a single continuous work. A recurring musical element was described as a "do-la" syllable; the opening uses "so la re mi" on strings as a hook, which then leads into the "do-la" syllable for other tracks, including the normal battle theme. While he was creating the music, Meguro received positive comments from Hashino when he made early tracks created for an internal demo.

A three-disc soundtrack was released in Japan by Mastard Records on January 17, 2017. Upon its debut, the album reached fifth on the Oricon charts with sales of over 29,000. The album features 110 tracks with commentary from the sound team, while the cover and liner note artwork were designed by Soejima. In addition to the soundtrack, a 19-track disc featuring a selection of the game's main themes, Persona 5: Sounds of the Rebellion, was released as part of the North American and European collector's edition bundle. The complete soundtrack later received a localized English release on iTunes on April 18, 2017, and on vinyl later that year by iam8bit.

Release

Persona 5 was first announced with a teaser trailer in November 2013, alongside spin-off games Persona Q: Shadow of the Labyrinth, Persona 4: Dancing All Night, and the PlayStation 3 port of Persona 4 Arena Ultimax. The game was originally announced for a late 2014 release exclusively for the PlayStation 3. During a Sony press conference in September 2014, it was announced that the game would also be released for the PlayStation 4 and that it had been delayed into 2015. According to director Katsura Hashino, the game was delayed to fully develop for the PlayStation 4, and improve the general quality of both versions. The first gameplay trailer was shown during a special livestream on February 5, 2015. The song used in the first gameplay trailer is an instrumental version of the main theme. A Blu-ray Disc containing an exclusive trailer was bundled with first print copies of Persona 4: Dancing All Night in Japan on June 25, 2015. During a special livestream at the 2015 Tokyo Game Show, it was announced that the game would be delayed to late 2016. Speaking in a staff interview, Hashino apologized for the delay and stated that it was necessary to deliver a high-quality product without having to hold back in terms of content.

In April 2016, Atlus launched a countdown that ran until May 5, 2016. Shortly after, a special livestream was announced titled Take Tokyo Tower, which coincided with the countdown date. During the Take Tokyo Tower livestream, a trailer revealed the game's final release date. Persona 5 was released in Japan on September 15, 2016. Along with the standard edition, a 20th Anniversary Edition was released, which features all downloadable content (DLC) based on Persona 3 and Persona 4, a five-CD best-of album set featuring music from all six main games in the series, and the official artbook for the game by Soejima. In honor of the game's Japanese release, the series-focused variety show Persona Stalker Club featured a new programming block titled Persona Stalker Club V. To promote the game in Japan, Atlus partnered with AKG Acoustics to release limited edition wireless headphones based on the one Futaba wears in-game. The headphones were released in December 2016 and came with box art designed by Soejima, as well as a music CD featuring two remixed tracks from the game by Meguro and Kozuka. Certain in-game character apparel, such as jackets and tote bags, were also released in Japan in February and March 2018.

Following its release, character costumes and additional Personas were released as paid DLC. The costumes include those incorporated into the 20th Anniversary Edition based on Persona 3 and Persona 4, in addition to new costumes based on the characters of Revelations: Persona, the Persona 2 duology (Innocent Sin and Eternal Punishment), Shin Megami Tensei If..., Catherine, Shin Megami Tensei IV, Devil Summoner: Raidou Kuzunoha vs. the Soulless Army, Persona 4 Arena, and Dancing All Night. The costumes are accompanied by arranged battle music from each costume set's respective game, which replaces the default battle theme based on what costume Joker wears. Some of the key Personas from Persona 3 and Persona 4 were released in bundles that include a new design and the original design of each. In addition, PlayStation 4 themes and avatar sets were released based on the central characters of Persona 5. An additional difficulty setting known as "Merciless" was also released as free DLC.

Pre-order bonuses and its initial North American release date of February 14, 2017 was announced a week before E3 2016. Its release in Europe and Australia set for the same date was announced the following August. In November 2016, its release was pushed back two months to April 4. The stated reason was that Atlus wanted the game to be at its highest possible quality. Atlus USA published the game in North America. In Europe and Australia, it was published by Deep Silver. As with previous Persona games, the English localization was handled by Atlus USA and led by Yu Namba. According to Namba, the team began with a "blank slate" when choosing the English voice cast, as it was a new setting for the Persona series. Localizing Persona 5 was described by Namba as a massive project with the largest staff yet dedicated to the series. As project lead, Namba made the final call on issues brought up by the team during the localization process. The localized script was estimated as being 50% bigger than that of Persona 4 Golden. In English-speaking regions, the "Shin Megami Tensei" moniker was dropped from the title. For the English release, the Japanese dub was made available as free DLC.

Upon its worldwide release, Atlus published a set of guidelines for streaming footage of the game, noting that streamers who shared footage past a certain in-game date "[did] so at the risk of being issued a content ID claim or worse, a channel strike/account suspension". The guidelines were widely perceived as threatening, and were criticized by many in the games press and streaming community. About three weeks later, Atlus apologized for the tone of its original guidelines and revised its policy, extending the amount that could be streamed considerably, though some critics continued to argue that even the revised streaming policy remained unfriendly to the game's fans and counterproductive to its success.

Persona 5 Royal
Persona 5 Royal, released in Japan as Persona 5: The Royal, is an enhanced version of the game, in a similar vein to Persona 4 Golden. This version features an additional Phantom Thief member named Kasumi Yoshizawa, a new Palace, a new area of the city (Kichijōji), new music, additional plot and social elements, a playable third semester, and support for the PlayStation 4 Pro, alongside many other changes and additions. In a first for the series, Royal features subtitles in French, German, Italian, and Spanish. It features a new opening sequence directed by Yuichiro Hayashi and produced by MAPPA, and as with the original game, Domerica co-produced the new anime cutscenes. Atlus first teased the game as Persona 5 R in December 2018, with a full reveal in April 2019. It was released for the PlayStation 4 in Japan on October 31, 2019, and worldwide on March 31, 2020. The game was also released for the Nintendo Switch, PlayStation 5, Windows, Xbox One, and Xbox Series X/S on October 21, 2022. These versions were ported by Atlus owner Sega.

Sega published Royal in Europe and Australia, taking over from Deep Silver who published the original in those regions. Upon release, Royal received numerous character costume sets and Personas as paid DLC. Costumes include those based on the characters of Persona 5: Dancing in Starlight, Persona Q2: New Cinema Labyrinth, and Shin Megami Tensei: Strange Journey Redux, and of the characters from the Velvet Room. Additionally, Kasumi received costumes matching all previously released cosmetic DLC as part of her own bundle. Personas added include those from Persona 3 and 4 and a new one created for Persona 5 Royal. The returning Personas include a new design and the original design of each. A Battle Bundle was also released that, aside from including items to assist in combat, also features a challenge battle mode. All DLC from the original game was also made available as a free download for owners of Persona 5 Royal. The paid DLC created for Royal was included for free in the Nintendo Switch, PlayStation 5, Windows, Xbox One, and Xbox Series X/S versions. The game supports Xbox Play Anywhere on Microsoft platforms, but the PlayStation 5 version does not offer upgrade path or save data transfer from PlayStation 4.

Reception

Persona 5 has been cited as one of the greatest role-playing games of all time, receiving "universal acclaim" according to review aggregator Metacritic. Famitsu gave it a positive review, with the game garnering a near-perfect score. PlayStation Official Magazine – UK described it as "an unabashed masterpiece". IGNs Andrew Goldfarb said Persona 5 "stands out as an extraordinary, memorable experience and easily one of the deepest JRPGs of the last decade". RPGamer said that "With Persona 5, Atlus has once again proven that it is the master of the modern JRPG. With terrific style, addictive gameplay, and an engaging, thought-provoking story". One of the aspects that was highly praised was its graphical style and art direction. IGN listed it as one of the best contemporary role-playing games.

The quality of the English localization was one of the few aspects singled out for criticism, with Polygon describing it as "aggravatingly mediocre". Another was its treatment of LGBT topics. Kenneth Shepard noted in Paste that the only characters to exist outside of the game's thoroughly heteronormative setting are a "lecherous" gay couple who are treated as a joke, which led him to conclude that Persona 5 sees gay men "at best as a joke and at worst something revolting to be feared". These scenes' dialogue were altered in the Western version of Persona 5 Royal. Writing for Gayming Magazine, Shepard opined that Royals localization changes were appreciated, but the game was still broadly uninclusive to LGBT identities.

Royal 
Persona 5 Royal received "universal acclaim" from critics, according to review aggregator Metacritic, garnering an even higher score than the original. The game is the third-highest-rated PlayStation 4 game on Metacritic alongside Naughty Dog's The Last of Us Remastered. Famitsu praised Persona 5 Royal newer elements. Michael Higham of GameSpot lauded the new music, characters, and the added third semester, saying that it solves one of the original game's shortcomings of ending abruptly. He concluded his review saying that Royal refines an already great game and builds on what was best about it with a great new story and that it is "an unforgettable and empowering RPG that should be recognized as one of the best games of our time." IGNs Leana Hafer said Royal is "a living master class in how to take an already amazing game and amp it up to the next level." She commended the improvements to the Mementos dungeons saying "The fact that Atlus has made Mementos feel so much more alive is a massive improvement by itself."

Sales
The game received a boost to pre-order sales following the delay of Final Fantasy XV, which was originally scheduled to release the same month as Persona 5. Sales went up on Amazon Japan by 450%, bringing it to second place in their best-seller charts behind Tales of Berseria. In its first week of release, the PS4 version reached first place with sales of 264,793 copies, while the PS3 version reached second place with 72,974, resulting in total sales of 337,767 copies. This made Persona 5 the fastest-selling title in the series' history, surpassing Revelations: Persona, and together with Pro Evolution Soccer 2017 pushed sales of the PS4 up significantly over the previous week. It was later reported by Hashino that combined physical shipments and digital sales had reached over 550,000 copies by September 2016. Within three weeks of its launch in Japan, the game became Atlus' best-selling game in the country.

Outside of Japan, it was the biggest debut for any Persona game to date, with packaged sales five times better than Persona 4. On the PlayStation Network in April, the game topped the PS4 charts, and was third on the PS3, with Atlus announcing that it had shipped 1.5 million copies worldwide. By November 2017, that number had risen to over two million, which made it the best-selling game in the series. The success of Persona 5 contributed to increasing annual revenue for Sega, the owner of Atlus, in 2017. At the 2018 PlayStation Awards, it received the Platinum Prize for topping a million sales in Asia. Worldwide sales had risen to over 3.2 million copies by December 2019, not including Royal.

Persona 5 Royal shipped over 400,000 copies in Japan by December 2019. This brought total sales of Persona 5 and Royal to over  copies worldwide by December 2019. In February 2020, Royal topped the Media Create sales charts in South Korea and Taiwan. In the United Kingdom, Royal debuted at number five on the sales chart. , the game has sold over  copies worldwide, including  Royal copies.

When the game launched on additional platforms in October 2022, the Nintendo Switch version placed in second at 45,998 physical copies sold, and PlayStation 5 version placed in seventh at 5,051 units during the week from October 17 to October 23, according to Japanese publication Famitsu. In the United Kingdom, the re-release of Royal debuted at number six on the sales chart, with 79% of the launch week sales coming from the Nintendo Switch version. By November 30, 2022, the PlayStation 4 version of Royal had sold 2.3 million copies, and the ports to other platforms had sold a combined one million copies, bringing total sales of Royal to 3.3 million copies, and combined sales of all versions of Persona 5 to 6.5 million copies.

Total combined sales of Persona 5, Persona 5 Royal, and the spin-offs Dancing in Starlight and Strikers totaled 8.3 million by November 2022.

Awards
Persona 5 won two awards at the Japanese 2016 PlayStation Awards. At The Game Awards 2017, it was nominated for the show's "Game of the Year", "Best Art Direction", "Best Score/Music", and "Best Role Playing Game" awards, winning "Best Role Playing Game". It was named the second best game of 2017 by GameSpot, behind The Legend of Zelda: Breath of the Wild. In IGNs 2017 end of year awards, it won "Best RPG", and was also nominated for "Game of the Year", "Best PlayStation 4 Game", "Best Art Direction", "Best Story", and "Best Original Music". The game was also nominated for "Best International Game" at the 2017 Ping Awards, and for the "Best Music" and "Best Style" awards by Giant Bomb.

It was ranked as one of the best games of 2017 by Eurogamer, Polygon, The Verge, GamesRadar+, and Electronic Gaming Monthly end of year lists. Ray Porreca of Destructoid named it his fifth favorite game of 2017. The website also nominated it for "Best PS4 Game" in its 2017 Game of the Year Awards. Staff of Game Informer named it 2017's "Best Role-Playing Game", as well as "Best Narrative" and "Best Cast". In their reader's choice awards, it was voted "Best Role-Playing Game" and came in second for "Best Sony Game" and third for "Game of the Year". The game won the Tin Pan Alley Award for "Best Music in a Game" at the New York Game Awards 2018. It was also nominated for the "Best Visual Art" award at the Game Developers Choice Awards. In addition, it was nominated for "Role-Playing Game of the Year" at the 21st Annual D.I.C.E. Awards, and for "Excellence in Musical Score" and "Excellence in Art" at the 2018 SXSW Gaming Awards. The game was nominated for "Best Game Music Cover/Remix" at the 2019 G.A.N.G. Awards.

Persona 5 Royal won the award for "Best Music" at the Famitsu Dengeki Game Awards 2019, where it was also nominated for "Best RPG". It was nominated for "Best Role Playing Game" at The Game Awards 2020, but lost to Final Fantasy VII Remake.

Legacy

Prior to release, a standalone anime special titled Persona 5: the Animation -The Day Breakers- aired on Japanese television on September 3, 2016. Created by A-1 Pictures, The Day Breakers is set during the events of the game, being portrayed as a "sub event" separate from the main narrative. A manga adaptation by Hisato Murasaki began serialization online from September 15. Persona 5: The Animation, an anime television series based on the game's events, was produced by CloverWorks and began broadcast in April 2018. Persona 5: Dancing in Starlight, a rhythm game for the PlayStation 4 and PlayStation Vita, features the main cast of Persona 5 and was released in 2018. The cast is also featured in Persona Q2: New Cinema Labyrinth for the Nintendo 3DS, also released in 2018. Alongside teasing Royal, Atlus also announced Persona 5 Strikers, a hack and slash game developed by Koei Tecmo's studio Omega Force, with gameplay based on their Dynasty Warriors series. It was released in Japan for the Nintendo Switch and PlayStation 4 in 2020 and worldwide in 2021 for those platforms and Windows. Its plot acts as a direct continuation to Persona 5. A spin-off for Android and iOS named Persona 5: The Phantom X was announced in 2023, developed by Black Wings Game Studio and published by Perfect World Games; P-Studio assists in development for the game. Stage play adaptations under the title Persona 5: The Stage have been performed in Japan, with original music composed by Atsushi Kitajoh.

Joker appears as a playable character via downloadable content (DLC) in the 2018 crossover fighting game, Super Smash Bros. Ultimate. The game's director, Masahiro Sakurai, is a fan of the Persona series and stated that Joker was emblematic of the approach that he wanted to take with Ultimate DLC, adding that he wanted characters that were unique and fun to use within the Super Smash Bros. environment. Other characters and series elements have also made appearances in Dragon's Dogma Online, Phantasy Star Online 2, Lord of Vermilion Re:3, Sonic Forces, Puzzle & Dragons, Granblue Fantasy, Catherine: Full Body, Star Ocean: Anamnesis, Another Eden, Tokyo Mirage Sessions ♯FE Encore, Dragalia Lost, Super Monkey Ball Banana Mania, Alchemy Stars, Soul Hackers 2, War of the Visions: Final Fantasy Brave Exvius, and NieR Reincarnation.

Notes

References

External links

 
  (Persona 5 Royal 2022 release)

2016 manga
2016 video games
Atlus games
Child abuse in fiction
Deep Silver games
Fiction about social media
The Game Awards winners
High school-themed video games
Japanese role-playing video games
Manga based on video games
Nintendo Switch games
Persona 5
Persona 5
PlayStation 3 games
PlayStation 4 games
PlayStation 4 Pro enhanced games
PlayStation 5 games
Production I.G
Role-playing video games
Shogakukan manga
Shōnen manga
Single-player video games
Superhero video games
Theft in fiction
Video games about crime
Video games adapted into comics
Video games adapted into television shows
Video games based on mythology
Video games developed in Japan
Video games scored by Shoji Meguro
Video games set in 2016
Video games set in 2017
Video games set in the 21st century
Video games set in Tokyo
Video games using procedural generation
Video games with alternate endings
Video games with cel-shaded animation
Viz Media manga
Windows games
Wrongful convictions in fiction
Xbox Cloud Gaming games
Xbox One games
Xbox One X enhanced games
Xbox Series X and Series S games